This article describes the qualification for the 2022 Women's U19 Volleyball European Championship.

Pools composition
The second round organisers were drawn and then the pools were set accordingly, following the serpentine system according to their European Ranking for national teams as of December 2020. Rankings are shown in brackets. The CEV later excluded Belarus and Russia from participation in all competitions at the start of March 2022.

Second round

Third round

Second round

Pool A

|}

|}

Pool B

|}

|}

Pool C

|}

|}

Pool D

|}

|}

Pool E

|}

|}

Pool F

|}

|}

Pool G

|}

|}

Pool H

|}

|}

Pool I

|}

|}

Ranking of the second placed teams
Matches against the fourth placed team in each pool are not included in this ranking.

|}

Third round

Pool J

|}

|}

Pool K

|}

|}

References

External links
Official website

Women's Junior European Volleyball Championship
Europe